Bernard Khoury (born August 19, 1968, in Beirut, Lebanon) is a Lebanese architect. His work has been extensively published by the professional press. Khoury started an independent practice in 1993. Over the past fifteen years, his office has developed an international reputation and a significant diverse portfolio of projects both locally and abroad.

Background
Bernard Khoury was born on August 19, 1968, in Beirut, Lebanon. Khalil Khoury, a Lebanese architect and designer, is his father. Khalil Khoury worked with exposed concrete and designed the Mont La Salle School Campus, the Municipal Stadium of Jounieh and the Interdesign Showroom building. Khoury's father also produced work at differing scales ranging from the design and production of furniture items to his participation in the development of the master plan for the reconstruction of the Beirut Central District in 1977.

Bernard Khoury lived in and out of Lebanon during the early years of the Civil War where he scarcely made it through secondary school, before pursuing his architectural studies in the United States of America. He received his Bachelor of Fine Arts in 1990, a Bachelor of Architecture degree in 1991 from the Rhode Island School of Design (RISD), and a master's degree in Architectural Studies in 1993 from Harvard University.

Career
Khoury started his professional career soon after his graduate studies in post-war Beirut, which became his territory of experimentation where he produced 16 unbuilt projects spanning a period of four years (1993-1997). During the early years of his practice, he was financially supported by his family's furniture manufacturing business that provided him with a design studio and gave him access to the workshop and manufacturing facilities of their factories.

Khoury first came to public and critical attention with the completion of the B018 music club in 1998, his first built project. This building sparked a string of temporary projects, through which Khoury built a reputation for his ability to produce critical interventions in problematic zones. These include his first six built projects: the Centrale project (2000), Yabani (2001), the BLC Bank (2004), the Bank of Beirut pavilion in Chtaura (2005), as well as the Black Box (2005). In the media, various publications dubbed Khoury "the bad boy" of architecture in the Middle East.

Khoury's early clients came primarily from the entertainment industry. He then produced  projects for local banks.

His first international commission, the Pfefferberg Project, was in Berlin, Germany (1999-2001) and consisted of the conversion of an industrial block into a cultural quarter. Aborted commissions followed in Europe, including the Santa Cesarea project in Italy (2007), as well as residential projects in England, Spain and Serbia. He then worked on commissions such as the Tumo Center for Creative Technologies (2011), the Tumo Park (2011) and the Epygi Park Master Plan (2013) in Yerevan, Armenia, as well as the AGBU NKR Campus (2014) in Nagorno-Karabakh.

He has also worked in the Arab world. These comprise schemes in the Arabian Gulf region, such as the Fintas Market (2003) and the Andalus Development (2006) in Kuwait; the Alargan Business Bay Development (2006) and the Ajman Resort (2012-2013) in the United Arab Emirates; Al Qurm Mixed Use Development (2012) in Oman; Surramanraa (2005) in Riyadh; and the Suspended Gardens of Manama (2011) in Bahrain.

Khoury's first permanent building, IB3, was completed in 2006. IB3 was followed by Plot # 732 (2008), Plot # 183 (2009) and Plot # 893 (2010), all of which engage their surrounding urban fabric. These were followed by the developments on Plots # 1314 and 2251 (2013) in Beirut, in which Khoury designed his own residence.  Plot # 4371 (2009), a more recent residential project, allows its inhabitants to move their vehicles vertically within the buildings to park them in the center of their living room. Plot # 1282 (2010, also known as Factory Lofts) is characterized by its thin slabs and openness on all orientations, stretching over 166 meters in length with a perimeter of 430 linear meters. Plot # 1072 (2009, also known as the Skyline), Plot # 1342 (2010, also known as the Paramount) and Plot # 450 (2014, also known as the Grand Hotel de Beirut)  are high rise residential developments.

On a smaller scale, a number of Khoury's projects were produced mainly in the mountainous regions of Lebanon, including Plot # 7950 (2010), which houses 52 engines that operate its retractable roof, and Plot # 4328 (2010) with an accessible inclined façade culminating in a linear lap pool.

Academic 

Khoury has taught at the American University of Beirut (1994, 1995, 2003, 2010), École Polytechnique Fédérale de Lausanne (2008) and l’Ecole Speciale d’Architecture in Paris (2011-2012). He is co-founder of the Arab Center for Architecture.

Experimental 

 2013 - C’était un Rendez-vous [commissioned for group show at Centro Cultural Del Mexico Contemporaneo] Mexico City, Mexico 
 2012 - I Wish I Could Make Them All Look Like You [commissioned for the House of Today "Confessions" 2012 Biennale] Beirut, Lebanon
 2010 - Derailing Beirut  [commissioned for "Spazzio" opening show of the MAXXI Museum] Rome, Italy 
 2009 - Catherine Wants to Know [commissioned for solo show at the Beirut Art Center] Beirut, Lebanon
 2008 - P.O.W 08 [commissioned for "YOU Prison" group show at Sandretto Foundation] Torino, Italy 
 2006 - SS / DW [commissioned for "Moving Homes" group show at Sfeir-Semler Gallery] Beirut, Lebanon 
 1991 - Evolving Scars [Harvard University] Cambridge, U.S.A.

Awards 

 2008 - CNBC Award

References

External links
 Bernard Khoury Official Website

Lebanese architects
1969 births
Living people
Rhode Island School of Design alumni
Harvard Graduate School of Design alumni